Paruva Kaalam is a 1974 Indian Tamil-language film, directed by Jos A. N. Fernando, written by A. S. Prakasam, starring Srikanth, Roja Ramani, Kamal Haasan, Nagesh and Prameela. Roja Ramani paired up with Kamal Haasan for the first time. It is a remake of the 1972 Malayalam-language film Chemparathy. The film was released on 9 February 1974.

Plot 

Paruva Kaalam is the story of an innocent girl who gets raped. The film is the journey to trace the culprit.

Cast 
Roja Ramani as Shantha
Srikanth
Prameela as Kalarani
Kamal Haasan
Nagesh as Swamy Kamalanandham
Devika
Leo Prabu
Sachu as Pappamma
 A. Sasikumar as Jambhu

Soundtrack 
The soundtrack was composed by G. Devarajan, with lyrics written by Pulamaipithan and Poovai Senguttavan.

References

External links 
 

1970s Tamil-language films
1974 films
Films scored by G. Devarajan
Tamil remakes of Malayalam films